John Claude Nattes (c.1765, Dover–1839, London) was a watercolourist and topographical draughtsman of either French or English origin.

In 1789  Sir Joseph Banks commissioned him to record the buildings of Lincolnshire and  this  resulted in more than 700 drawings and watercolours, made between 1789 and 1797, which are now preserved  in Lincoln Central Library. This body of work provides researchers with a great deal of material with which to study pre-Victorian topography.  Nattes accompanied John Stoddart on his tours of Scotland in 1799 and 1800 and contributed illustrations to his Remarks on Local Scenery and Manners in Scotland (1801). 
 
Nattes produced some of the earliest examples of watercolour painting in Britain. He was associated with the founding of the Society of Painters in Watercolours, founded in 1804, but he was expelled after two years for exhibiting other peoples’ work as his own. He continued to exhibit at the Royal Academy until 1814.

According to the Dictionary of National Biography Nattes died in London in 1822. However he may have died in Dover, in 1839. This later date is supported by his apparently being a witness at the wedding of Robert Holdsworth Carew Hunt and Bridget Margaret Barber on 16 June 1836 at Holy Trinity Church, Clapham. According to Dover Museum, "The parish records show that John Claude Nattes of Welbeck Street, Cavendish Square, Middlesex (London), died 7th September 1839 at Dover, aged about 75 years. His funeral was held at St Mary's Church Dover, on the 14th September 1839, and he was buried in Cowgate Cemetery Dover where the gravestone can still be seen". It is believed Nattes was temporarily resident in Dover for the sea air and sea bathing benefits to his health.

John Claude Nattes married Sarah Barber, daughter of William and Jane Barber. Their son Charles Claude Nattes, born 13 January 1794, was christened in St Andrew, Holborn. He died 21 January 1818 in Penang as a lieutenant in the service of the Madras Engineers. Sarah died in late 1845.

References

External links

  Nattes' images of Crambe and area at Manchester Art Gallery.
 Scotia Depicta, etchings of Scottish towns, building, and landscapes created from Nattes' on-site drawings

1760s births
1839 deaths
18th-century English painters
19th-century English painters
English male painters
French draughtsmen
British draughtsmen
English watercolourists
French watercolourists
19th-century English male artists
18th-century English male artists